Zhaxigang Township (transl. "auspicious hillock")
is a township-level administrative unit under the jurisdiction of Gar County,
Ngari Prefecture, Tibet Autonomous Region. It has jurisdiction over Zhaxigang Village, Luma Village and Dianjiao Village.

According to the data of the Fifth National Population Census, the resident population of Zhaxigang Township was 729. And its Statistical division code is 542523203000.

References

Populated places in Ngari Prefecture
Township-level divisions of Tibet